Terzo may refer to:

 Terzo, Piedmont, a town in Piedmont, Italy
 Terzo d'Aquileia, a town in Friuli-Venezia Giulia, Italy